Deborah Cook is the name of:
 Deborah Cook (soprano) (1938–2019), American opera singer
 Deborah Cook (philosopher) (born 1954), Canadian philosopher
 Debbie Cook (born 1954), American politician
 Deborah J. Cook, Canadian medical scientist
Deborah L. Cook (born 1952), American judge